BHE may be:

 Barnhouse Effect
 Before Human Era
 Berkshire Hathaway Energy
 Bharat Heavy Electricals Limited
 Block der Heimatsvertriebenen und Entrechteten, a 1950s West German political party.
 Borehole heat exchangers
 Bus High Enable a signal that indicates a data transfer on the highest byte on the processor bus
 IATA airport code for Woodbourne Airport, west of Blenheim in the South Island of New Zealand.
 Bischoff Hervey Entertainment, a media production company